Neolamprologus furcifer is a species of cichlid endemic to Lake Tanganyika where it prefers to live solitatirily in lightless cracks, crevices, caves, etc. where it feed on other organisms that also dwell in that habitat. This species can reach a length of  TL.  This species can also be found in the aquarium trade, where it is a highly sought-after species.

References

furcifer
Taxa named by George Albert Boulenger
Fish described in 1898
Taxonomy articles created by Polbot